Episode 1 is an EP by Norwegian DJ and electronic music duo Broiler. It was released in Norway as a digital download on 29 November 2013. The EP includes the single "Colors". It peaked at number 19 on the Norwegian Albums Chart.

Singles
 "Colors" was released as the lead single from the album on 29 November 2012. The song peaked at number 18 on the Norwegian Singles Chart.

Track listing

Chart performance

Weekly charts

Release history

References

2013 albums
DJ Broiler albums